"Wanted" is a song written by American country music artist Alan Jackson and Charlie Craig, and recorded by Jackson. It was released in May 1990 as the third single from Jackson's first album, Here in the Real World. The song peaked at number 3 on both the Billboard Hot Country Singles & Tracks (now Hot Country Songs) charts and the Canadian RPM Country Tracks Chart.

Background and writing
The front cover resembles a western "wanted" poster. Jackson was inspired to write the song after seeing a wanted poster in an old John Wayne movie.

Content
The song is a mid-tempo ballad in which the male narrator decides to place a classified ad to describe what he wants from a lover: "Wanted, one good hearted woman / To forgive imperfection / In the man that she loves".

Critical reception
Kevin John Coyne of Country Universe gave the song a B− grade," saying that the song contains "heartfelt vocal and sincere delivery." He goes on to say that "if a lesser singer was at the mic, the sheer implausibility of the lyric would be nakedly evident, but Jackson will have you looking in the classified section, expecting the chorus to be there."

Music video
The music video was directed by Bing Sokolsky and premiered in mid-1990.

Peak chart positions

Year-end charts

References

1990 singles
Alan Jackson songs
Songs written by Alan Jackson
Songs written by Charlie Craig
Song recordings produced by Keith Stegall
Song recordings produced by Scott Hendricks
Arista Nashville singles
1990 songs